Plus One: The Home Video is a VHS released in 2001 by Word Entertainment and Atlantic Records that shows behind the scenes of what the boys of Plus One do everyday on stage and off.

The Video
The video contains footage of the everyday lives of the quintet group from Plus One, showing what they do when they're not on stage.

Music Videos
The video also contains two music videos, "Written on my Heart" and "God is in This Place." Both of these are from their debut album The Promise.

References

External links 

Direct-to-video films